The 1996 ITC Interlagos round was the twelfth round of the 1996 International Touring Car Championship season. It took place on 27 October at the Autódromo José Carlos Pace.

Alessandro Nannini won the first race, starting from pole position, and Nicola Larini gained the second one, both driving an Alfa Romeo 155 V6 TI.

Classification

Qualifying

Race 1

Race 2

Standings after the event

Drivers' Championship standings

Manufacturers' Championship standings

 Note: Only the top five positions are included for both sets of drivers' standings.

References

External links
Deutsche Tourenwagen Masters official website

1996 International Touring Car Championship season